Zita Cobb, is a Canadian businesswoman and social entrepreneur. In 2006, she established Shorefast, a Canadian social enterprise, with her brothers Anthony and Alan Cobb on Fogo Island, Newfoundland.

Early life and education 
Cobb is an eighth-generation Fogo Islander. Cobb has six brothers, and her father was an inshore fisherman. She grew up in a household with no electricity or running water. She battled and survived tuberculosis at the age of six, which she credits for the confidence that she carried with her later into her career. Cobb studied business and graduated from Carleton University in Ottawa.

Career 
Cobb started working with various oil companies in Alberta, and traveling in Canada and Africa. She worked at Ottawa-based JDS Fitel for ten years and became the CFO. The company merged with the U.S. company Uniphase in 1999 to become JDS Uniphase. In 2001, she exercised stock options worth US$69 million, and left the company to sail around the world for 4 years.

Fogo Island Inn 
In 2006, Cobb and her brother Andy founded Shorefast, a Canadian social enterprise, in response to the economic and cultural difficulties her Newfoundland outport home had experienced over the past decades. She contributed $10 million of her own money to the organization. The Canadian government contributed $5 million, and the provincial government contributed another $5 million. Shorefast built the Fogo Island Inn, which opened in 2013 and continues to be operated by Shorefast Social Enterprises Inc. The inn is a 100% social business, and all operating surpluses are reinvested in the community of Fogo Island through the projects and programs of Shorefast. The inn aims to build another leg on the existing economies of the island and to provide employment.

Honours and awards 
On June 30, 2016, Cobb was made a Member of the Order of Canada by Governor General David Johnston for "her contributions as a social entrepreneur who has helped revive the unique rural communities of Fogo Island and Change Islands through innovative social engagement and geotourism."

She has been recognized with honorary doctorate degrees from Carleton University, Memorial University of Newfoundland, McGill University and University of Ottawa.

Cobb was inducted into the Junior Achievement Business Hall of Fame in May 2018.

On November 12, 2019, Cobb interviewed 44th President of the United States Barack Obama for a public event at the Mile One Centre in St. John's, Newfoundland and Labrador, which was hosted by the St. John's Board of Trade. More than 5,000 people attended the discussion, which covered topics of community, climate change and democracy.

References 

Canadian women in business
Living people
Members of the Order of Canada
Year of birth missing (living people)